Elections to the Baseball Hall of Fame for 1983 followed the system in place since 1978. 
The Baseball Writers' Association of America (BBWAA) voted by mail to select from recent major league players and elected two, Juan Marichal and Brooks Robinson. The Veterans Committee met in closed sessions to consider older major league players as well as managers, umpires, executives, and figures from the Negro leagues. It selected Walter Alston and George Kell. A formal induction ceremony was held in Cooperstown, New York, on July 31, 1983, with Commissioner of Baseball Bowie Kuhn presiding.

BBWAA election 
The BBWAA was authorized to elect players active in 1963 or later, but not after 1977; the ballot included candidates from the 1982 ballot who received at least 5% of the vote but were not elected, along with selected players, chosen by a screening committee, whose last appearance was in 1977. All 10-year members of the BBWAA were eligible to vote.

Voters were instructed to cast votes for up to 10 candidates; any candidate receiving votes on at least 75% of the ballots would be honored with induction to the Hall. The ballot consisted of 46 players; a total of 374 ballots were cast, with 281 votes required for election. A total of 3,125 individual votes were cast, an average of 8.36 per ballot. Those candidates receiving less than 5% of the vote will not appear on future BBWAA ballots but may eventually be considered by the Veterans Committee.

Candidates who were eligible for the first time are indicated here with a dagger (†). The one candidate who received at least 75% of the vote and was elected is indicated in bold italics; candidates who have since been elected in subsequent elections are indicated in italics. The 23 candidates who received less than 5% of the vote, thus becoming ineligible for future BBWAA consideration, are indicated with an asterisk (*).

Gil Hodges and Red Schoendienst were on the ballot for the 15th and final time. 

The newly-eligible players included 22 All-Stars, three of whom were not included on the ballot, representing a total of 68 All-Star selections. Among the new candidates were 15-time All-Star Brooks Robinson, 9-time All-Star Joe Torre, 7-time All-Star Dick Allen and 5-time All-Star Cookie Rojas. The field included four MVPs (Allen, Robinson, Torre and Boog Powell), one Cy Young Award-winner (Mike Cuellar), and two Rookies of the Year (Allen and Tommy Helms). Brooks Robinson also had 16 Gold Gloves, the all-time record at third base.

Players eligible for the first time who were not included on the ballot were: Ken Boswell, Ollie Brown, Willie Crawford, Bruce Dal Canton, Tom Hall, Steve Hargan, Terry Harmon. Mike Hegan, Bob Heise, Jerry Johnson, Ed Kirkpatrick, George Mitterwald, Dave Nelson, Phil Roof, and Gary Ross.

J. G. Taylor Spink Award 
Si Burick (1909–1986) received the J. G. Taylor Spink Award honoring a baseball writer. The award was voted at the December 1982 meeting of the BBWAA, and included in the summer 1983 ceremonies.

References

External links 
1983 Election at www.baseballhalloffame.org

Baseball Hall of Fame balloting
Hall of Fame balloting